General Byng may refer to:

George Byng, 3rd Viscount Torrington (1701–1750), British Army major general
John Byng, 1st Earl of Strafford (1772–1860), British Army general
Julian Byng, 1st Viscount Byng of Vimy (1862–1935), British Army general